The 2007 Akwa Ibom State gubernatorial election was the 4th gubernatorial election of Akwa Ibom State. Held on April 14, 2007, the People's Democratic Party nominee Godswill Akpabio won the election, defeating James Iniama of the Action Congress of Nigeria.

Results 
Godswill Akpabio from the People's Democratic Party won the election, defeating James Iniama from the Action Congress of Nigeria. Registered voters was 1,408,197.

References 

Akwa Ibom State gubernatorial elections
Akwa Ibom gubernatorial